The Greenfield Elementary School (Pittsburgh, Pennsylvania) in the Greenfield neighborhood of Pittsburgh, Pennsylvania, is a building from 1922. It was listed on the National Register of Historic Places in 1986.  Pennsylvania also has an Albert M. Greenfield Elementary School in Philadelphia.

References

External links
School Website

School buildings on the National Register of Historic Places in Pennsylvania
Chicago school architecture in Pennsylvania
School buildings completed in 1922
Schools in Pittsburgh
City of Pittsburgh historic designations
Pittsburgh History & Landmarks Foundation Historic Landmarks
Kiehnel and Elliott buildings
National Register of Historic Places in Pittsburgh
1922 establishments in Pennsylvania
Greenfield (Pittsburgh)